Pierre César Dery (2 February 1768 – 18 October 1812) was a French general.

1768 births
1812 deaths
Barons of the First French Empire
French generals
Military personnel killed in the Napoleonic Wars
Officiers of the Légion d'honneur
Names inscribed under the Arc de Triomphe